Gilbert Kemp (born 1888) was an English professional footballer who played as an inside left.

Career
Born in Wallasey, Kemp moved from Oldham Athletic to Bradford City in July 1919, leaving the club in October 1919 to sign for Coventry City. During his time with Bradford City he made one appearance in the Football League. He joined Grimsby Town in January 1920, and scored one goal in nine appearances.

He played for Doncaster Rovers between 1920 and 1922, scoring 12 league goals for them. He was playing for Denaby United by September 1922.

Sources

References

1888 births
Date of death missing
English footballers
Oldham Athletic A.F.C. players
Bradford City A.F.C. players
Coventry City F.C. players
Grimsby Town F.C. players
Doncaster Rovers F.C. players
Denaby United F.C. players
English Football League players
Association football inside forwards